La Garnache is a commune in the Vendée department in the Pays de la Loire  region in western France.

Population

See also
Communes of the Vendée department
François de Charette

References

Communes of Vendée